Nord 4.1201 to 4.1272 was a class of French Mikado tank locomotives built for suburban service on the Chemin de fer du Nord's lines that are north of Paris.

They were designed by Marc de Caso, an engineer working in the company's engineering design office. They were equipped with the same boiler as the Nord's "Superpacifics" (3.1251 to 3.1290) They also had "Cossart" type rotary cam actuated valve gear.

The series were renumbered 2-141.TC.1 to 2-141.TC.72 by SNCF after its creation in 1938; the class was still in service until December 12, 1970, when the use of steam traction on the Nord commuter network had ended.

Construction history
The 72 locomotives were built from 1932 until 1935 by seven manufacturers, including the railway's own workshops at Hellemmes, Lille

Service history
In 1935, the 4.1200s essentially provide commuter services at the head of push-pull trains composed of five to nine cars, up to 420 tons gross. They are found between Paris on the one hand and Ermont, Creil and Pontoise on the other. In addition to the commuter traffic, 4.1200's also take charge of the freight service between Persian-Beaumont and Luzarches with reversal at Montsoult.

The beginning of the end began in 1969 and the last two trains to have been powered by 2-141.TC ran on December 12, 1970, with train 1731 between Paris-Nord and Valmondois via Ermont-Eaubonne (with 2-141.TC.64), and train 1748 between Persian-Beaumont and Paris-Nord via Valmondois and Ermont-Eaubonne (with 2-141.TC.54)

Preservation

One locomotive has been preserved: 4.1251 / 2-141.TC.51 (SFB 2696 of 1934). This locomotive was featured in an exhibition at the Brussels International Exposition, in 1935. It has since been preserved by AAATV of Lille, and stored at Ascq.

Models
The 4.1200s / 2-141.TCs  have been reproduced in HO scale by:
 RMA (French firm), brass injected model, released in 1987, 20 years after being announced
 Keyser (English craftsman), as a white metal kit
 Metropolitan (or Metrop) (high-end Swiss), brass model
 Fulgurex (high-end Swiss), very fine brass model.

References

See also

List of Chemins de Fer du Nord locomotives

4.1201
2-8-2T locomotives
Railway locomotives introduced in 1932
Schneider locomotives
Fives-Lille locomotives
Standard gauge locomotives of France
ANF locomotives
Passenger locomotives